I-SPARSH (Initiative of Samajwadi Party and Akhilesh Rural Sustainable Homes) was a village development scheme in Uttar Pradesh launched by former chief minister Akhilesh Yadav. This scheme aim was to develop village.

History 
This scheme was launched on 30 March 2016 by former CM Akhilesh Yadav. Akhilesh Yadav told during launching this scheme, don't have smart word, i have made a new word i.e. I-SPARSH.

Scheme 
300 Cr. rupees UP I Sparsh Scheme launched by government of Uttar Pradesh to get all Villages of Uttar Pradesh in the model school type. To focus major implement of this I Sparsh Scheme major village will be chosen according to their vikas, smart village, nagar palika and panchayati. I Sparsh yojna is also termed as Smart city yojna in village is implemented as Janeshwar Mishra Village Development Scheme other region in UP.

See also 

 Kamdhenu Yojna
 Hamari Beti Uska Kal Scheme

References 

Government schemes in Uttar Pradesh
Rural development in India